The 2006 Appalachian State Mountaineers football team represented Appalachian State University in the 2006 NCAA Division I FCS football season. The team was coached by Jerry Moore and played their home games at Kidd Brewer Stadium in Boone, North Carolina.

The football team competes in the Division I Football Championship Subdivision (FCS), formerly I-AA, as a member of the Southern Conference. Appalachian is the only university  in North Carolina, public or private, to win a National Collegiate Athletic Association (NCAA) national championship in football. Appalachian won the 2005 Division I-AA Football Championship and repeated as FCS national champions in 2006.

Before the season

Schedule

Game summaries

NC State

James Madison

Mars Hill

Gardner–Webb

Elon

Chattanooga

Wofford

Georgia Southern

Furman

The Citadel

Western Carolina

Coastal Carolina

Montana State

Youngstown State

Massachusetts

Rankings

Awards and honors
 Southern Conference Coach of the Year (coaches and media) — Jerry Moore
 Southern Conference Roy M. "Legs" Hawley Offensive Player of the Year (media) — Kevin Richardson
 Southern Conference Offensive Player of the Year (coaches) — Kevin Richardson
 Southern Conference Defensive Player of the Year (coaches) — Marques Murrell
 Southern Conference Freshman of the Year (coaches and media) — Armanti Edwards
 Southern Conference Jacobs Blocking Trophy — Kerry Brown

Statistics

Team

Scores by quarter

2006 statistics at GoASU

References

Appalachian State
Appalachian State Mountaineers football seasons
NCAA Division I Football Champions
Southern Conference football champion seasons
Appalachian State Mountaineers football